Nong Khwai is a tambon (subdistrict) of Hang Dong District, in Chiang Mai Province, Thailand. In 2005 it had a population of 8344 people. The tambon contains 12 villages.

References

Tambon of Chiang Mai province
Populated places in Chiang Mai province